If I Were for Real is a 1981 Taiwanese drama film directed by Wang Toon. It is an adaptation of the 1979 play of the same name by Sha Yexin, Li Shoucheng and Yao Mingde, set in mainland China. The film made some changes to the story to turn "the satirical comedy into political propaganda which condemns Chinese communism". The film was banned not only in mainland China (like the play), but also in British Hong Kong until 1989.

Cast
Alan Tam as Li Xiaozhang
Nancy Hu as Zhou Minghua
Hsiang Lin as Qiao Hong, an actress in the theatrical troupe
Lin Tzay-peir as Yao Qing, son of Zhou Minghua's factory boss
Chang Feng as Zhou Minghua's father
Chang Ping-yu as Theatre Director Zhao
Ma Chia-li as Division Head Qian
Wei Su as Secretary Wu
Lei Ming as Section Head Sun
Wu Chiao-ling as Sun Juanjuan
Ko Hsiang-ting as Farm Director Zheng
Tsui Fu-sheng as Wang Yun, deputy mayor of Shanghai
Ku Chun as Li Da

Differences from the play
As a propaganda film that condemns communism, the film "in a total disregard of the inherent ambiguities in the play" made a number of "changes which drastically alter the meaning", according to Gilbert C. F. Fong.
Characters associated with the Chinese government are demonized by removing positive traits. Farm Director Zheng, who displays some conscience in the play, is completely pathetic in the film. The virtuous Venerable Comrade Zhang in the play becomes "cold, aloof, and keen on punishment instead of persuasion" Li Da and is given a much smaller role. 
The film introduces a crude, licentious, and corrupt character Wang Yun, (clearly fictitious) deputy mayor of Shanghai who keeps an innocent actress as his mistress, thus strengthening the negative impression associated with the ruling elite. 
In the film, Zhou Minghua's pregnancy is revealed much earlier than in the play. As a result, the opportunistic prankster Li Xiaozhang is seen in a much more positive light, as a hero fighting for the survival of his future family.
The play ends with Li Xiaozhang on trial and Zhou Minghua in the hospital. In the film, Zhou Minghua drowns herself (and her unborn baby), while Li Xiaozhang cuts his wrist and inscribes with his blood the words "If I Were for Real" on the cell wall before his death. (In real life, the imposter Zhang Quanlong (张泉龙) on whom Li Xiaozhang is based, was released after 3 years in prison.)

Theme song
Teresa Teng sang the theme song, which was included in her 1981 album of the same name. (In the film, Farm Director Zheng secretly listens to Teresa Teng's "When Will You Return?" and hides a picture of her on the back of a Chairman Mao portrait.)

Awards and nominations
1981 18th Golden Horse Awards
Won—Best Film
Won—Best Adapted Screenplay (Chang Yung-hsiang)
Won—Best Actor (Alan Tam)
Nominated—Best Cinematography (Lin Hung-chung)
Nominated—Best Art Direction (Wang Toon)

The film was also selected as the Taiwanese entry for the Best Foreign Language Film at the 54th Academy Awards, but was not accepted as a nominee.

See also
 List of submissions to the 54th Academy Awards for Best Foreign Language Film
 List of Taiwanese submissions for the Academy Award for Best Foreign Language Film

References

External links
 

1981 films
1981 drama films
Taiwanese drama films
1980s Mandarin-language films
Films set in Shanghai
Films with screenplays by Chang Yung-hsiang
Taiwanese films based on plays
Films directed by Wang Toon